The following is a list of clones of Tandy's TRS-80 model I and III home computers:
 Aster CT-80 by Aster b.v. 
 DGT-100 and DGT-1000 by Digitus 
 D8000, D8001 and D8002 by Dismac 
 Komtek I by  Komtek Technologies  
 Le Guépard by  HBN Electronic Sa 
 LNW-80  by LNW Research 
 Max-80 by Lobo Systems 
 Meritum by Mera-Elzab 
 MTI Mod III Plus by Microcomputer Technology Inc.  
 CP-300 and CP-500 by Prológica 
 Pentasonic PROF 80 
 R1001 by Radionic  
 Sysdata Jr by Sysdata Eletrônica Ltda 
 Video Genie (also known as the "Dick Smith System-80" or the "PMC-80") by EACA 
Misedo 85 by Montex 
HT-1080Z School Computer (Híradástechnikai Szövetkezet, Hungary) 
SpotLight I (스포트라이트I) by Hanguk Sangyeok (한국상역)

References 
 

TRS-80 clones
TRS-80 Clones
TRS-80 clones